The 2008–09 Liechtenstein Cup was the sixty-fourth season of Liechtenstein's annual cup competition. Seven clubs competed with a total of eighteen teams for one spot in the second qualifying round of the UEFA Europa League. Defending champions were FC Vaduz, who have won the cup continuously since 1998.

First round
The First Round featured fourteen teams. The only first team of a club that had to compete in this round was FC Triesen, while the other two teams eligible for the first round, FC Triesenberg and FC Schaan, received a bye. The games were played on August 26 – 28, 2008.

|colspan="3" style="background-color:#99CCCC"|

|-
|colspan="3" style="background-color:#99CCCC"|

|-
|colspan="3" style="background-color:#99CCCC"|

|}

Second round
The six winners of the First Round, along with the two teams who had received a bye, competed in the Second Round. The first teams of FC Balzers, USV Eschen/Mauren, FC Ruggell and FC Vaduz were all given a bye in this round. The games were played on September 17 and 19, 2008.

|colspan="3" style="background-color:#99CCCC"|

|-
|colspan="3" style="background-color:#99CCCC"|

|}

Quarterfinals
The four winners of the Second Round, along with the four teams who had received a bye, competed in the Quarterfinals. The games were played on October 21, 22, 28 and 29, 2008.

|colspan="3" style="background-color:#99CCCC"|

|-
|colspan="3" style="background-color:#99CCCC"|

|-
|colspan="3" style="background-color:#99CCCC"|

|-
|colspan="3" style="background-color:#99CCCC"|

|}

Semifinals
The four winners of the Quarterfinals competed in the Semifinals. The games were played on April 28 and 29, 2009.

|colspan="3" style="background-color:#99CCCC"|

|-
|colspan="3" style="background-color:#99CCCC"|

|}

Final
The Final was played on May 21, 2009 at Rheinpark Stadion, Vaduz.

References

External links
 Official site 
 RSSSF

Liechtenstein Football Cup seasons
Liechtenstein Cup, 2008-09
Liechtenstein Cup, 2008-09